The Gangdong Bridge is a bridge in over the Han River, South Korea, and connects the city of Guri and the Gangdong District of Seoul. This bridge is a part of the Seoul Ring Expressway.

See also
List of Han River bridges

External links

Bridges in Seoul
Bridges in Gyeonggi Province
Buildings and structures in Guri
Bridges completed in 1991
Buildings and structures in Gwangjin District
1991 establishments in South Korea